New York's 77th State Assembly district is one of the 150 districts in the New York State Assembly. It has been represented by Democrat Latoya Joyner since 2015.

Geography
District 77 is located in The Bronx, comprising portions of Claremont, Concourse, Highbridge, Mount Eden and Morris Heights.

Recent election results

2022

2020

2018

2016

2014

2012

2010

2009 special

References

77